"Soundings: A Contemporary Score" was a survey of new sound art exhibited at the Museum of Modern Art in 2013.

Bibliography 

 
 
 
 
 
 
 
 
 

Museum of Modern Art (New York City) exhibitions
2013 in New York City